The Latin Church Archdiocese of Lviv was erected on August 28, 1412 in the city of Lwów (today Lviv). It serves as a metropolitan see of the Roman Catholic Church in Ukraine. The principal patron of the Archdiocese is the Blessed Virgin Mary Mother of Mercy.

History
In 1909 Pope Pius X proclaimed the Blessed Virgin Mary, Queen of Poland and Blessed Jakub Strzemię to be the patrons of the Lviv archdiocese. In 1910 the Blessed Virgin Mary, Queen of Poland became the principal patron. Nowadays the principal patron is the Blessed Virgin Mary Mother of Mercy (NMP Łaskawa). The patron's day is celebrated on 1 April, the day when King of Poland Jan II Kazimierz Waza took an oath at the Lwów Cathedral in 1655, during "The Deluge," took vows of loyalty to God and declared the Mother of God to be the Queen of Poland.

List of Latin Catholic bishops of Lviv

Bishops of Lwów (Lviv)
 1375–1380 Maciej 
 1384–1390 Bernard 
 1391–1409 bl. Jakub Strzemię (Jakub Strepa) 
 1410–1412 Mikołaj Trąba

Metropolitan Archbishops of Halicz (Halych)

Metropolitan Archbishops of Lwow (Lviv)
In 1414 a metropolitan see was moved from Halych to Lviv. Diocese of Halicz was merged with diocese of Lwow.

Metropolitan Archbishops of Lviv (and Ukraine de facto)An attempt to liquidate the Catholic Church in Ukraine was made with the start of World War II in 1939 and partition of Poland between Nazi Germany and Soviet Union. After World War II and until fall of the Soviet Union, the Archdiocese of Lwów was centered in Lubaczów.
 1944–1962 Eugeniusz Baziak
1962–1964 Michał Orliński (Apostolic Administrator in Lubaczów)
1964–1973 Jan Nowicki (Apostolic Administrator in Lubaczów)
1973–1983 Marian Rechowicz (Apostolic Administrator in Lubaczów)
1983–1984 Stanisław Cały (Apostolic Administrator in Lubaczów)
1984–1991 Marian Jaworski (Apostolic Administrator in Lubaczów)
 1991–2008 Marian Jaworski
 2008–present Mieczysław Mokrzycki

Auxiliary bishops

See also
List of Greek Catholic bishops of Lviv
List of Armenian Catholic bishops of Lwów
The Shoes of the Fisherman

References

External links
 The Latin Archbishop of Lviv

Roman Catholic bishops of Lwów
Poland religion-related lists
Lviv